The 2013 Nigeria Professional Football League will be the 42nd season of the competition since its inception, and the 23rd since the rebranding of the league as the "Professional League".
Due to start in December, numerous delays and challenges to the board pushed the opening weekend back to February, and then pushed to March 9. 
There was a season-opening Super Four tournament won by Heartland F.C. between the four clubs involved in Continental competitions in order to get them ready for their international assignments.

Clubs
Sixteen teams from the previous season and four teams promoted from the Nigeria National League (Bayelsa United, El-Kanemi Warriors, Nasarawa United and Nembe City F.C.) participated in this season.

Table

News
Akwa United were banished to Rojenny Stadium in Anambra State for the rest of the season after a Week 18 incident against Warri Wolves where fans invaded the pitch and attacked officials.

A September game between Kano Pillars and Enyimba was abandoned in the final minutes because of crowd trouble. Pillars will play the rest of the season in Kaduna. After the league originally awarded the forfeit to Enyimba, the NFF ruled the game to be replayed 9 October in Lokoja.

Managerial (head coach) changes

References 

Nigeria Professional Football League seasons
Nigeria
1